1115 Sabauda  is a carbonaceous Meliboean asteroid from the outer region of the asteroid belt, approximately 68 kilometers in diameter. Discovered in 1928 by Italian astronomer Luigi Volta, it was assigned the provisional designation . The asteroid was probably named after the House of Savoy, the former rulers of Italy.

Discovery 

Sabauda was discovered on 13 December 1928, by Italian astronomer Luigi Volta at the Observatory of Turin (Pino Torinese Observatory). Five nights later, it was independently discovered by Catalan astronomer Josep Comas i Solà at the Fabra Observatory in Barcelona, Spain.

Orbit and classification 

Sabauda is a member of the Meliboea family, a smaller asteroid family of carbonaceous outer-belt asteroids with a few hundred members, named after 137 Meliboea. It orbits the Sun in the outer main-belt at a distance of 2.6–3.6 AU once every 5 years and 6 months (1,998 days). Its orbit has an eccentricity of 0.17 and an inclination of 15° with respect to the ecliptic.

Physical characteristics 

Sabauda is an assumed carbonaceous C-type asteroid, in line with the Meliboea family's overall spectral type.

Rotation period 

Several rotational lightcurves of Sabauda were obtained from photometric observations. Lightcurve analysis gave a rotation period between 6.718 and 6.732 hours with a brightness amplitude of 0.16 to 0.27 magnitude.

Diameter and albedo 

According to the surveys carried out by the Infrared Astronomical Satellite IRAS, the Japanese Akari satellite and the NEOWISE mission of NASA's Wide-field Infrared Survey Explorer, Sabauda measures between 67.24 and 75.91 kilometers in diameter and its surface has an albedo between 0.04 and 0.0711.

The Collaborative Asteroid Lightcurve Link derives an albedo of 0.0496 and a diameter of 68.53 kilometers based on an absolute magnitude of 9.7.

Naming 

This minor planet bears the Latin name of the former rulers of Italy, the House of Savoy (Sabauda, or Sapauda). It is also possible that it was named after the new established town of Sabauda in the Pontine Marshes, central Italy. The official naming citation was mentioned in The Names of the Minor Planets by Paul Herget in 1955.

Notes

References

External links 
 Asteroid Lightcurve Database (LCDB), query form (info )
 Dictionary of Minor Planet Names, Google books
 Asteroids and comets rotation curves, CdR – Observatoire de Genève, Raoul Behrend
 Discovery Circumstances: Numbered Minor Planets (1)-(5000) – Minor Planet Center
 
 

001115
Discoveries by Luigi Volta
Named minor planets
19281213